"Revolution" is a song written and performed by Jars of Clay. The song is the third of four radio singles released in promotion of the band's The Eleventh Hour. A live version of the song can be found on disc two of the 2003 double album, Furthermore: From the Studio, From the Stage.

Track listing
"Revolution" – 3:40 (Dan Haseltine, Matt Odmark, Stephen Mason, & Charlie Lowell)

Charts
 No. 3 Christian CHR
 No. 4 Christian Rock

2002 singles
Jars of Clay songs
Songs written by Dan Haseltine
Songs written by Charlie Lowell
Songs written by Stephen Mason (musician)
Songs written by Matt Odmark
2001 songs
Essential Records (Christian) singles